Amor sem Igual (English title: Ultimate Love) is a Brazilian telenovela produced by RecordTV and Casablanca that premiered on 10 December 2019 and ended on 18 January 2021. The series is written by Cristianne Fridman and directed by Rudi Lagemann. It stars Day Mesquita, Rafael Sardão, Thiago Rodrigues, Juan Alba, Sthefany Brito, Heitor Martinez, Gabriel Gracindo and Barbara França in the main roles.

Plot 
In her childhood Angélica (Day Mesquita) was rejected by her father for being the result of an affair and abandoned by her mother. She was abused by older men, grew up in a miserable and loveless life and resorts to prostitution under the name of Poderosa to sustain herself. Her father is millionaire Ramiro (Juan Alba), owner of Bras Talentos Esportivos, an important company that provides agency for soccer players and trainers in the country. Ramiro is in need of a kidney transplant or else he will die. His legitimate children, Tobias (Thiago Rodrigues) and Fernanda (Bárbara França), are incompatible so he decides to look for his bastard daughter in the hope that she will be a donor, which irritates Tobias, who does not want to share the inheritance, counting on the help of Bernardo (Heitor Martinez) and Leandro (Gabriel Gracindo) to eliminate Angélica before and guarantee the death of his father. After almost being killed, Angélica is saved by Miguel (Rafael Sardão), an honest farmer from Mogi das Cruzes who works in the Municipal Market, flourishing a troubled romance, since she does not trust anyone or believes in love.

Cast 
 Day Mesquita as Angélica Silva Viana / Poderosa
 Rafael Sardão as Miguel Gonçalves Aguiar
 Thiago Rodrigues as Tobias Andrade Viana
 Juan Alba as Ramiro Viana
 Sthefany Brito as Donatella Ribeiro
 Heitor Martinez as Bernardo Rodrigues
 Gabriel Gracindo as Leandro Campello
 Barbara França as Fernanda Andrade Viana
 Guilherme Dellorto as Pedro Antônio Barros Cordeiro
 Daniele Moreno as Berenice Lima / Furacão
 Michelle Batista as Maria Antônia Barros Cordeir
 José Victor Pires as Hugo Alves
 César Cardadeiro as José Antônio Barros Cordeiro
 Selma Egrei as Norma Andrade
 Paulo Figueiredo as Geovani Ribeiro
 Françoise Forton as Emília Pinto Alvares / Olympia
 Ernani Moraes as Antônio Barros Cordeiro "Oxente"
 Andréa Avancini as Zenaide Barros Cordeiro
 Matheus Costa as Peppe Trovatelli
 Brenda Sabryna as Rosa Flor Moreti
 Miguel Coelho as Antônio Barros Cordeiro Júnior "Antônio Júnior"
 Juliana Lohmann as Cindy Lopes de Freitas
 Malu Falangola as Ioná Coutinho
 Manuela do Monte as Fabiana Braga Motta
 Henrique Camargo as Caio Lima
 Miguel Nader as Willian Souza "Duplex"
 Beth Zalcman as Augusta Guimarães / Carmem Maia
 Eduardo Lago as Luiggi Trovatelli
 Kika Kalache as Serena Trovatelli
 Pedro Nercessian as Roberto "Beto" de Bragança
 Marcela Muniz as Sônia Magalhães
 Iara Jamra as Yara Baldin
 Paulo Reis as Ernani Carvalho Baldin
 Castrinho as Bento Apolinário
 Thierry Figueira as Delegado Fonseca
 Camila Mayrink as Vânia Vilela
 Raphael Montagner as Juliano Gomes Santanna
 Thiago Amaral as Wesley
 Marcelo Batista as Alberto Nicolau "Mike Tyson"
 Marcio Elizzio as Santiago
 Isadora Cecatto as Bibiana Trovatelli
 Bernardo Mesquita as Mauro
 Yohama Eshima as Doctor Tatiana
 Nica Bonfim as Ludmila
 Carlos Takeshi as Takashi 
 Jui Huang as Chang
 Alexandre Lino as Xavier
 Ivan Rios as Olavo
 Wiliam Melo as Nino
 Márcia di Milla as Marly
 Milton Filho as Enf. Chico
 Pablo Barros as Guilherme Dias "Cata Bola"

Guest cast 
 Camila Rodrigues as Sophia Loren Alencar
 Felipe Cunha as Antonio Ramos Gonçalves
 Ariane Rocha as Young Amanda Silva
 Charles Paraventi as Danilo Gusmão
 Paulo Vilela as Geraldo
 Jonathan Nogueira as Tião
 Ed Oliveira as Matias
 Raul Labancca as Rubens
 Savio Moll as Dr. Fragoso
 André Melo as Edson
 William Vita as Jair
 Thiago Giacomini as Mosar
 Pablo Sobral as Almeida
 Eduardo Lassah as Oswaldo
 Ana Varello as Luciana
 Guilherme Mendonça as Nivaldo
 Leonardo Lima as Rodrigo
 Matheus Sampaio as Ivan
 Maju Rodrigues as Verônica
 Ju Fontana as Suelen
 Bruna Negendank as Child Fernanda
 Vanderlei Luxemburgo as Himself
 Luiz Bacci as Himself

Production 
Filming of the telenovela began on 15 October 2019. Exterior scenes were filmed between 14 and 22 November 2019 in Avenida Paulista, Rua Augusta, Rua Oscar Freire, Estação da Luz, Municipal Market of São Paulo and Rodovia Anchieta. On 16 March 2020, it was announced that filming of the telenovela was suspended for a week so that RecordTV could assess what action to take through the global crisis caused by the COVID-19 pandemic. The following day it was announced that the suspension would be extended indefinitely until the pandemic stabilized. On 26 March 2020, a rerun of Apocalipse was announced, temporarily replacing the telenovela during the filming suspension.

Ratings

References

External links 
 

2019 telenovelas
2019 Brazilian television series debuts
2021 Brazilian television series endings
2010s Brazilian television series
Brazilian telenovelas
RecordTV telenovelas
Portuguese-language telenovelas
Television productions suspended due to the COVID-19 pandemic